Muralla de Santiago de Compostela is a fort in Santiago de Compostela, Province of A Coruña, Galicia, Spain. It was abandoned in the 15th century.

References

 Forts in Spain
 Buildings and structures in Santiago de Compostela